Queen–Gordon Streets Historic District is a national historic district located at Kinston, Lenoir County, North Carolina. It encompasses 20 contributing buildings in a mixed commercial and industrial section of Kinston.  The buildings include notable examples of Classical Revival, Beaux-Arts, and Romanesque style architecture and date between 1895 and the mid-1930s. Notable buildings include the Gordon Street Christian Church (1912-1915), (former) U. S. Post Office/Federal Building (1915), Citizens / First National Bank Building (1903), (former) Farmers and Merchants Bank (1924), Canady Building (1899), and the LaRoque and Hewitt Building (c. 1900).

It was listed on the National Register of Historic Places in 1989.  The Kinston Commercial Historic District is considered a boundary increase to the Queen–Gordon Streets Historic District.

References

Historic districts on the National Register of Historic Places in North Carolina
Romanesque Revival architecture in North Carolina
Beaux-Arts architecture in North Carolina
Neoclassical architecture in North Carolina
Buildings and structures in Lenoir County, North Carolina
National Register of Historic Places in Lenoir County, North Carolina